My Yiddishe Momme: Neil Sedaka at Chequers is a 1966 Australian compilation album containing the works of American pop singer Neil Sedaka. Eight of the songs on this album had been previously released earlier in Sedaka's career, but it included four new recordings produced in RCA's Australian studios in Sydney, Australia, following a concert Sedaka had given at Sydney's famous Chequers nightclub. It was released on RCA's Australian label.

Track listing

Side 1
 Israeli Medley (Shalom Aleichem, Artza Aleinu, Tzena, Tzena, Tzena)
 Smile
 Happy Birthday Sweet Sixteen
 All The Way
 You Mean Everything To Me
 My Yiddishe Momme

Side 2
 Scapriciatiello
 I Found My World In You
 Look To The Rainbow
 Little Devil
 Nothing Ever Changes My Love For You
 Hallelujah I Love Her So

Tracks 1, 6, 7 and 12 were new recordings produced at RCA's Australian studios in Sydney.
Tracks 2, 4, 8, 9 and 11 were originally released on Sedaka's Circulate album in 1961, and Track 8 was issued as the B-side of "Sweet Little You" that same year.

Neil Sedaka albums
1966 compilation albums